Yashima is a Japanese surname. Notable people with the surname include:

 Norito Yashima (born 1970), Japanese actor
 Taro Yashima (1908–1994), Japanese-American author and illustrator

Fictional characters:
Mirai Yashima, character in Mobile Suit Gundam

Japanese-language surnames